Structurae is an online database containing pictures and information about structural and civil engineering works, and their associated engineers, architects, and builders. Its entries are contributed by volunteers and saved in a MySQL database.

Overview
Structurae was founded in 1998 by Nicolas Janberg, who had studied civil engineering at Princeton University. At that time, the web site received more than one million pageviews per month, and was available in English, French and German. In 2015, Janberg bought the site back to operate it as a freelancer again. 

Buildings in the Structurae database

References

External links

Architecture websites
German websites
Architecture databases
Online databases
Databases in Germany